Leanne Hinton (born 28 September 1941) is an American linguist and emerita professor of linguistics at the University of California at Berkeley.

Education and career 
Hinton received her PhD in 1977 from UC San Diego, with a dissertation entitled "Havasupai songs: a linguistic perspective," written under the supervision of Margaret Langdon. After joining the Berkeley faculty in 1978, Hinton began working with California languages.

Hinton specializes in American Indian languages, sociolinguistics, and language revitalization. She has been described as "an authority on how and why languages are being lost, the significance of language diversity, and the ways in which indigenous tongues can be revitalized before it's too late." "She first worked with Native American groups on bilingual education, orthographic design and literature development.

Hinton is a director of the Survey of California and Other Indian Languages (SCOIL), and also participates in language revitalization efforts and organizations, including the Advocates for Indigenous California Language Survival and its biennial Breath of Life conferences, for which she is a consulting board member. In collaboration with Andrew Garrett, Hinton has also directed a project to digitize many of the SCOIL records, which are now available through the California Language Archive. Hinton was involved in the creation of the Master-Apprentice Language Learning Program while working with indigenous language speakers in California.

Awards and achievements 
In 2006, Leanne Hinton was awarded a Cultural Freedom Award, which honours individuals who support communities in upholding diversity, cultural freedom and creativity, from the Lannan Foundation.

In 2012, she was awarded the Language, Linguistics, and the Public award from the Linguistic Society of America.

Published works
 
 
 
 
 
 
 
 
   ASIN B0006YSJ6W

References

External links
 Hinton's home page

Linguists from the United States
Language revival
University of California, Berkeley College of Letters and Science faculty
American social sciences writers
Writers from the San Francisco Bay Area
People from Alameda County, California
Living people
Native American language revitalization
Linguists of Algic languages
Linguists of Havasupai–Hualapai
Linguists of Uto-Aztecan languages
20th-century American women writers
20th-century American non-fiction writers
21st-century American women writers
American women non-fiction writers
21st-century American non-fiction writers
20th-century linguists
21st-century linguists
Women linguists
1941 births
American women academics